The Treaty with Tunis was signed on February 24, 1824 (24 Ramada II, A. H. 1239), between the United States of America and the "Barbary State" of Tunis, nominally part of the Ottoman Empire.  

Ratified by the United States between January 13 and 21, 1825

See also
List of treaties

External links
Text of the Treaty

Barbary Wars
Tunis
Tunis
Tunisia–United States relations
1824 treaties
Treaties of Tunisia
Ottoman Tunisia
February 1824 events